Aptrakovo (Aptraq) is a rural locality (a village) and the administrative centre of Aptrakovsky Selsoviet, Meleuzovsky District, Bashkortostan, Russia. The population was 312 as of 2010. There are 7 streets.

Geography 
Aptrakovo is located 26 km southeast of Meleuz (the district's administrative centre) by road. Mullagulovo is the nearest rural locality.

References 

Rural localities in Meleuzovsky District